The seventh season of CSI: Crime Scene Investigation premiered on CBS on September 21, 2006, and ended May 17, 2007. The series stars William Petersen and Marg Helgenberger.

Plot
Catherine heads to a small town in Nevada ("Leaving Las Vegas") as Grissom and Sara continue their affair ("Living Doll"), in the seventh season of CSI. Supervised by Grissom and Willows, the Las Vegas Crime Scene Investigators face both personal and professional challenges as Grissom says goodbye, and new CSI Michael Keppler joins the team ("Sweet Jane"), as they investigate the bizarre, the brutal, and the unprecedented, including a chainsaw massacre ("Toe Tags"), a death at a church ("Double-Cross"), a kidnapping ("Burn Out"), a series of miniature killings ("Post Mortem"), the death of identical twins ("Happenstance"), and the return of a 1970s Mob Boss to Vegas ("Living Legend"). Meanwhile, Catherine faces the loss of her father ("Built to Kill"), Greg is assaulted ("Fannysmackin'"), Keppler faces his past ("Law of Gravity"), and the team attempt to hide their amusement when a man is found trapped in concrete ("Loco Motives").

Cast

Changes
Louise Lombard joins the main cast, and departs at the season's end.

Main cast

 William Petersen as Gil Grissom, a CSI Level 3 Supervisor
 Marg Helgenberger as Catherine Willows, a CSI Level 3 Assistant Supervisor
 Gary Dourdan as Warrick Brown, a CSI Level 3
 George Eads as Nick Stokes, a CSI Level 3
 Jorja Fox as Sara Sidle, a CSI Level 3
 Eric Szmanda as Greg Sanders, a CSI Level 2
 Robert David Hall as Al Robbins, the Chief Medical Examiner
 Louise Lombard as Sofia Curtis, a Homicide Detective
 Paul Guilfoyle as Jim Brass, a Homicide Detective Captain

Recurring cast

Guest cast
 Roger Daltrey as Mickey Dunn

Episodes

References

07
2006 American television seasons
2007 American television seasons